Fuad Gasimzade  is an Azerbaijani philosopher and academician. His main area of research area was Azerbaijani philosophic public opinion, social philosophy, ontology, epistemology and aesthetics.

His doctoral thesis was titled "Fizuli’s outlook”. His monograph "Caravan of sorrow" or "Light in the darkness" was printed in 1968. He wrote more than 20 scientific articles about Fizuli.

Fuad Gasimzade wrote the book titled “Sport, beauty and aesthetics”. It was printed in 1970.

Scientific publications
 "Caravan of Grief, or light in the dark", 1968
 "Sport, beauty and esthetic ", 1970
 "Dialectical materialism", 1971
 "Two phenomena and islam", 2000
 "The views of Qudsi", 2000-2001

References

External links
 simurq-az.org
 news.lent.az
 Fuad Qasımzadə
 kitabxana.net

20th-century Azerbaijani philosophers
Azerbaijani philosophers
Epistemologists
Ontologists
Philosophers of art
Social philosophers